Ibrahim Yehia (born October 17, 1987) is an Egyptian professional footballer who plays as a center-back for the Egyptian club Enppi. He previously played for Ismaily SC before signing a 3-year contract for Enppi for 750,000 Egyptian pound per season.

References

External links
 
 

1987 births
Living people
ENPPI SC players
Ismaily SC players
Egyptian footballers
Association football defenders
Egyptian Premier League players